Pachydesmini is a tribe of flat-backed millipedes in the family Xystodesmidae. There are at least 3 genera and more than 20 described species in Pachydesmini.

Genera
These three genera belong to the tribe Pachydesmini:
 Dicellarius Chamberlin, 1920
 Pachydesmus Cook, 1895
 Thrinaxoria Chamberlin & Hoffman, 1950

References

Further reading

 
 
 
 
 

Polydesmida
Articles created by Qbugbot
Arthropod tribes